Cara Honeychurch of Melbourne, Victoria, Australia is a female world champion tenpin bowler. She won the AMF Bowling World Cup in 1996 in Belfast, Northern Ireland, and voted Bowler of the Year by the World Bowling Writers the same year. She was inducted to the World Bowling Writers' International Hall of Fame in 1998.

For 35 years, she was a champion in the sport of tenpin bowling in Australia, from representing Australia as an athlete beginning in 1989 to serving as the chief executive officer (CEO) of Tenpin Bowling Australia (TBA) for a decade, until 2020.

Career

Amateur
Honeychurch is a left-hander bowler who was known for her pinpoint accuracy and finesse, and her accuracy and speed control helped her win numerous titles, particularly in open events.
From 1989 until 1998, Honeychurch was a nine-time Australian representative, and she went on to become one of the most successful Australian bowlers in history.

Honeychurch has a long list of domestic successes, including three Australian Masters championships, the NSW Open, three VIC150 victories, and five Adelaide Women's Cup winners. Her accomplishments in open events, when she competed against some of the country's best male competitors, stand out. She won her first of three open titles in 1997, the South Australian Cup.

The South Pacific Classic was qualifier for the Bowling World Cup. Honeychurch won the competition four times, however she only competed in the BWC twice. She made her debut in 1994, finishing third, before returning in 1996 to win the World Cup. She was the second Australian to win the event.

In the Asian Youth, Asian Championships, World Youth, and World Championships, she won 23 medals: eleven gold medals, nine silver medals, and three bronze medals. In the 1997 World Games she won the silver medal in Mixed Doubles with Andrew Frawley. She won three gold medals at the 1998 Commonwealth Games in Kuala Lumpur, in the singles, doubles, and mixed doubles events.

Honeychurch was named Asian Bowler of the Year in 1994 and 1995 and World Bowling Writers Bowler of the Year in 1996 and 1998 for her several victories in international tournaments.

Bowling at the Summer Olympics
Bowling made appearances at the Olympics in 1988 and 1996, but not as part of the official sports events. It was added as a demonstration sport by the IOC to show off the sport to the rest of the world and to be considered for inclusion in future Games. The Fédération Internationale des Quilleurs (FIQ) Atlanta Bowling Challenge was held on Georgia Institute of Technology's student union lanes during the 1996 Centennial Olympic Games. Cara Honeychurch took the title in this competition.

Professional
She turned professional before the 1999 World Championships and moved to the United States, where the sport is shown on national television and over 80 tournaments are held each year. On the Professional Women's Bowling Association (PWBA) Tour, Honeychurch made an outstanding debut. In her debut year as a professional, she dominated the season averages and finished second on the money earning rankings. She made two appearances on television right away, one for a title, one for a broadcast 300-game, and another for another 300-game the following week.

In 2000, the Australian won two more titles, capturing the PWBA Rookie of the Year award. She added four titles in 2001, and the final of her eight wins in 2002. After eight events, the PWBA Tour ended in 2003.

She returned to the PWBA Tour when it was re-launched in 2015 by the United States Bowling Congress (USBC) and Bowling Proprietors’ Association of America (BPAA) 
She won the United States Bowling Congress Women's Challenge in October 2006, defeating Clara Guerrero, the 2005 World Ranking Masters winner, in the final.

Recognition
In 2022, she was inducted into Sport Australia Hall of Fame.

References

Australian ten-pin bowling players
Living people
Commonwealth Games gold medallists for Australia
Competitors at the 1997 World Games
World Games silver medalists
World Games medalists in bowling
Sport Australia Hall of Fame inductees
1972 births